is a city located in the western portion of Tokyo Metropolis, Japan. It is one of 30 municipalities in the western portion of Tokyo known as the Tama Area. , the city had an estimated population of 83,218, and a population density of 13,000 persons per km2. Based on the 2015 Kanto Ranking, Musashino was the fifth most desirable place to live in Central Japan. It is the smallest administrative city in Tokyo Metropolis both in area and population, and the second smallest in terms of area in the nation.

Geography

Komae is nestled between the Tama River to the southwest, and the much smaller Nogawa River to the north and east which flows near its boundaries with Chōfu city and Setagaya Ward. It is mostly flat. It is a small municipality; its boundaries fit within a circle of 2 km radius centred on the city hall. It is essentially a residential suburb of Tokyo which urbanised rapidly in the 1960s and 1970s, with most of the working population commuting to central Tokyo. There are several neighbourhood shopping areas, mainly around the train stations. The City Hall is located near Komae Station.

Surrounding municipalities
Tokyo Metropolis
Setagaya
Chōfu
Kanagawa Prefecture
Kawasaki

Climate
Komae has a Humid subtropical climate (Köppen Cfa) characterized by warm summers and cool winters with light to no snowfall.  The average annual temperature in Komae is 14.8 °C. The average annual rainfall is 1647 mm with September as the wettest month. The temperatures are highest on average in August, at around 26.0 °C, and lowest in January, at around 3.8 °C.

Demographics
Per Japanese census data, the population of Komae increased rapidly in the 1950s and 1960s, but has remained relatively constant for the past 40 years.

History
The city's name is thought to originate from the word koma, referring to migrants, especially Goguryeo from the Korean peninsula who settled here around the 5th century AD. Numerous kofun burial mounds are located within the city borders.

The area of present-day Komae was part of ancient Musashi Province. In the post-Meiji Restoration cadastral reform of July 22, 1878, the area became part of Minamiitama District in Kanagawa Prefecture. The town of Komae was created on April 1, 1889, with the establishment of the modern municipalities system. Minamtama District was transferred to the administrative control of Tokyo Metropolis on April 1, 1893. Odakyu Railways's Odawara line was constructed through Komae in 1926, linking it with Shinjuku in central Tokyo. Expanding population led to Komae being upgraded to the status of a town in 1952, and to a city on October 1, 1970.

On September 1, 1974, Tama River's levee failed during a typhoon, and 19 houses were destroyed by torrential flooding. The riverbanks have now been strengthened. A small memorial stands at the location of the levee failure.

Government
Komae has a mayor-council form of government with a directly elected mayor and a unicameral city council of 26 members. The current mayor is Kunihiko Takahashi, an independent heading a coalition of the Democratic Party of Japan with the Liberal Democratic Party of Japan and the Komeito, which ousted long-term  Japanese Communist Party mayor Yutaka Yano in 2012. Komae, together with the city of Chōfu, contributes three members to the Tokyo Metropolitan Assembly. In terms of national politics, the city is part of Tokyo 26th district of the lower house of the Diet of Japan.

 2007 Komae city assembly election

Education
The one public high school,  Komae High School, is operated by the Tokyo Metropolitan Government Board of Education.

Komae has six public elementary schools and four junior high schools schools operated by the city.

Public junior high schools:
 Komae No. 1 (狛江第一中学校)
 Komae No. 2 (狛江第二中学校)
 Komae No. 3 (狛江第三中学校)
 Komae No. 4 (狛江第四中学校)

Public elementary schools:
 Izumi (和泉小学校)
 Komae No. 1 (狛江第一小学校)
 Komae No. 3 (狛江第三小学校)
 Komae No. 5 (狛江第五小学校)
 Komae No. 6 (狛江第六小学校)
 Midorino (緑野小学校)

Transportation

Railway
 Odakyu Electric Railway – Odakyū Odawara Line
 -  
(Some areas in the north of the city have better access to Keiō Line stations in neighbouring Chōfu city.)

Highway
Komae is not served by any national highways or expressways.

Local attractions
Annual events in Komae include a raft-race on Tama River every July, and a city fair in mid-November.

The town has a group of festival mascots called Komarangers; their purpose is to cheer up the citizens of the town.  They come in five colors: red, blue, green, yellow, and pink.

Notable people from Komae
 Sadao Araki. Army general and pre-war rightwing politician
 Sumire Haruno. Takarazuka actress

References

External links

Komae City Official Website 

 
Cities in Tokyo
Western Tokyo